Çatalzeytin District is a district of the Kastamonu Province of Turkey. Its seat is the town of Çatalzeytin. Its area is 272 km2, and its population is 7,229 (2021).

Composition
There is one municipality in Çatalzeytin District:
 Çatalzeytin

There are 41 villages in Çatalzeytin District:

 Arıca
 Aşağısökü
 Canlar
 Celaller
 Çağlar
 Çatak
 Çepni
 Çubuklu
 Dağköy
 Doğanköy
 Duran
 Epçeler
 Fındıklı
 Güneşler
 Hacıreis
 Hacıreissökü
 Hamidiye
 İsmailköy
 Karacakaya
 Kaşlıca
 Kavaklı
 Kavakören
 Kayadibi
 Kaymazlar
 Kızılcakaya
 Kirazlı
 Konaklı
 Kozsökü
 Köklüce
 Kuğuköy
 Kulfallar
 Paşalı
 Piri
 Samancı
 Saraçlar
 Sırakonak
 Sökü
 Yemişli
 Yenibeyler
 Yukarısökü
 Yunuslar

References

Districts of Kastamonu Province